Danelle Barrett (born  July 20, 1967) is a retired U.S. Navy Rear Admiral. She is one of less than 200 women in history to achieve the US Naval rank of admiral.

Early life, education, personal life
Barrett was born on July 20, 1967  in Buffalo, New York, she has one brother. 

Barrett attended Boston University, graduating in 1989 with a Bachelor of Arts.   She earned a  Masters of Arts in Management, National Security/Strategic Studies, and Human Resources Development.  Barrett also graduated with a Master of Science in Information Management. 

On June 10, 2020, Barrett was elected to the Board of Directors for KVH Industries. 

Married, Barrett has one daughter.

Military career
 
She served tours at U.S. Naval Forces Central Command/U.S. 5th Fleet, and served as commander of the 2nd Fleet, Carrier Strike Group Two, and Multinational Forces-Iraq. She also served tours at the Carrier Strike Group 12, which included deployments in support of the Afghanistan-focused Operation Enduring Freedom and the Haiti-focused Unified Response mission. She has worked at the Standing Joint Force Headquarters United States Pacific Command. She also worked as the deputy director of current operations at the U.S. Cyber Command. 

Barrett’s shore assignments included tours at Naval Computer and Telecommunications Stations in Cecil Field , Puerto Rico, and Jacksonville, Florida.  Barrett also served as the senior Navy fellow at the Armed Forces Communications and Electronics Association, and as the Allied Commander Atlantic Systems Support Center at the Norfolk Naval Personnel Command. She served as the Chief of Naval Operations Task Force Web. The US Navy assigned her as the commanding officer of the Naval Computer and Telecommunications Area Master Station Atlantic, and later as the chief of staff of the Navy Information Forces Command. 

Prior to retiring from the US Navy, Barrett served as the director of the US Navy Cyber Security Division.

Honors
 Defense Superior Service Medal 
 Copernicus Awards - 1998, 2000, 2005 
 Naval Institute Command, Control, Computers and Communication writing award 
 Department of Defense Chief Information Officer Award - first place individual category - 2006 
  Federal 100 winner - 2010 
 Armed Forces Communications and Electronics Association Women in Leadership Award - 2014  
 Women in Technology Leadership Award - 2017

Writing
In June 2021, Barrett published, “Rock the Boat: Encourage Innovation, Lead Change and Be a Successful Leader.” It has been on the Amazon Best Seller list in several categories.   Barrett has also authored and published 35 articles.

References

1967 births
United States Navy admirals
People from Buffalo, New York
Living people